YLK Organization was a short-lived Hong Kong musical duo and one of the earliest bands under local label People Mountain People Sea. The duo consists of vocal Kitty Yu (余力姬) and musician Chan Fai Young (陳輝煬), who later went on to become an important Cantopop songwriter.

YLK Organization launched 2 official albums, including YLK Organization (1997) and Happiness (2000), the cover of the latter album parodies the famous poster of French New Wave director Jean-Luc Godard's Breathless.

External links
 Unofficial website of YLK Organization

Hong Kong musical groups